Roar Arntzen (born 23 November 1947) is a Norwegian engineer.

He grew up in Rosenborg and Byåsen, and took the siv.ing. degree at the Norwegian Institute of Technology in his hometown. He was hired as a researcher in SINTEF in 1971, an institute for technical and industrial research. In 1977 he was hired as a chief engineer in Autronica, where he served five years as chief executive from 1984 to 1989, when he became director of the SINTEF company Elab-Runit. He advanced further to vice chief executive of SINTEF in 1991 and chief executive in 1995. He was first acting chief executive for some months before being hired on a permanent basis in November 1995. In March 2002 he was announced as the new chief executive of St. Olav Hospital. He resigned in March 2006, and was succeeded by Gunnar Bovim.

Arntzen chairs Renholdsverket and has chaired Trondheim Symphony Orchestra. He is a member of the gentlemen's club Harmonien. He is a fellow of the Norwegian Academy of Technological Sciences.

As of 2020, he sits on the board of directors for 5 companies and currently serves as the director of Trondheim Parkering, a parking company.

References

1947 births
Living people
People from Trondheim
Norwegian Institute of Technology alumni
Norwegian engineers
Members of the Norwegian Academy of Technological Sciences
Directors of hospitals of Norway